Leucoagaricus gaillardii is a species of fungi belonging to the family Agaricaceae.

It is native to Northern Europe.

References

Agaricaceae